Main Street Historic District is a national historic district located at Afton in Chenango County, New York. The district includes 11 contributing buildings.  All but one of the buildings are two or three story commercial blocks built between 1868 and 1900.

It was added to the National Register of Historic Places in 1983.

References

Historic districts on the National Register of Historic Places in New York (state)
Historic districts in Chenango County, New York
National Register of Historic Places in Chenango County, New York